Hydrogen fluoride (fluorane) is an inorganic compound with the chemical formula . This colorless gas or liquid is the principal industrial source of fluorine, often as an aqueous solution called hydrofluoric acid. It is an important feedstock in the preparation of many important compounds including pharmaceuticals and polymers, e.g. polytetrafluoroethylene (PTFE). HF is widely used in the petrochemical industry as a component of superacids. Hydrogen fluoride boils at near room temperature, much higher than other hydrogen halides.

Hydrogen fluoride is an extremely dangerous gas, forming corrosive and penetrating hydrofluoric acid upon contact with moisture. The gas can also cause blindness by rapid destruction of the corneas.

History
In 1771 Carl Wilhelm Scheele prepared the aqueous solution, hydrofluoric acid in large quantities, although hydrofluoric acid had been known in the glass industry before then.
French chemist Edmond Frémy (1814–1894) is credited with discovering hydrogen fluoride (HF) while trying to isolate fluorine.

Structure and reactions

HF is diatomic in the gas-phase. As a liquid, HF forms relatively strong hydrogen bonds, hence its relatively high boiling point.  Solid HF consists of zig-zag chains of HF molecules. The HF molecules, with a short covalent H–F bond of 95 pm length, are linked to neighboring molecules by intermolecular H–F distances of 155 pm.  Liquid HF also consists of chains of HF molecules, but the chains are shorter, consisting on average of only five or six molecules.

Comparison with other hydrogen halides
Hydrogen fluoride does not boil until 20 °C in contrast to the heavier hydrogen halides, which boil between −85 °C (−120 °F) and −35 °C (−30 °F). This hydrogen bonding between HF molecules gives rise to high viscosity in the liquid phase and lower than expected pressure in the gas phase.

Aqueous solutions

HF is miscible with water (dissolves in any proportion). In contrast, the other hydrogen halides exhibit limiting solubilities in water. Hydrogen fluoride forms a monohydrate HF.H2O with m.p.−40 °C (−40 °F), which is 44 °C (79 °F) above the melting point of pure HF.

Aqueous solutions of HF are called hydrofluoric acid. When dilute, hydrofluoric acid behaves like a weak acid, unlike the other hydrohalic acids, due to the formation of hydrogen-bonded ion pairs [·F−]. However concentrated solutions are strong acids, because bifluoride anions are predominant, instead of ion pairs. In liquid anhydrous HF, self-ionization occurs:

which forms an extremely acidic liquid.

Reactions with Lewis acids
Like water, HF can act as a weak base, reacting with Lewis acids to give superacids. A Hammett acidity function (H0) of −21 is obtained with antimony pentafluoride (SbF5), forming fluoroantimonic acid.

Production
Hydrogen fluoride is typically produced by the reaction between sulfuric acid and pure grades of the mineral fluorite:

About 20% of manufactured HF is a byproduct of fertilizer production, which generates hexafluorosilicic acid. This acid can be degraded to release HF thermally and by hydrolysis:

Use
In general, anhydrous hydrogen fluoride is more common industrially than its aqueous solution, hydrofluoric acid. Its main uses, on a tonnage basis, are as a precursor to organofluorine compounds and a precursor to cryolite for the electrolysis of aluminium.

Precursor to organofluorine compounds
HF reacts with chlorocarbons to give fluorocarbons.  An important application of this reaction is the production of tetrafluoroethylene (TFE), precursor to Teflon.  Chloroform is fluorinated by HF to produce chlorodifluoromethane (R-22):

Pyrolysis of chlorodifluoromethane (at 550-750 °C) yields TFE.

HF is a reactive solvent in the electrochemical fluorination of organic compounds. In this approach, HF is oxidized in the presence of a hydrocarbon and the fluorine replaces C–H bonds with C–F bonds. Perfluorinated carboxylic acids and sulfonic acids are produced in this way.

1,1-Difluoroethane is produced by adding HF to acetylene using mercury as a catalyst.

The intermediate in this process is vinyl fluoride or fluoroethylene, the monomeric precursor to polyvinyl fluoride.

Precursor to metal fluorides and fluorine
The electrowinning of aluminium relies on the electrolysis of aluminium fluoride in molten cryolite. Several kilograms of HF are consumed per ton of Al produced.  Other metal fluorides are produced using HF, including uranium hexafluoride.

HF is the precursor to elemental fluorine, F2, by electrolysis of a solution of HF and potassium bifluoride. The potassium bifluoride is needed because anhydrous HF does not conduct electricity. Several thousand tons of F2 are produced annually.

Catalyst
HF serves as a catalyst in alkylation processes in refineries. It is used in the majority of the installed linear alkyl benzene production facilities in the world. The process involves dehydrogenation of n-paraffins to olefins, and subsequent reaction with benzene using HF as catalyst. For example, in oil refineries  "alkylate", a component of high-octane petrol (gasoline), is generated in alkylation units, which combine C3 and C4 olefins and iso-butane.

Solvent
Hydrogen fluoride is an excellent solvent. Reflecting the ability of HF to participate in hydrogen bonding, even proteins and carbohydrates dissolve in HF and can be recovered from it. In contrast, most non-fluoride inorganic chemicals react with HF rather than dissolving.

Health effects

Hydrogen fluoride is highly corrosive and a powerful contact poison. Exposure requires immediate medical attention. It can cause blindness by rapid destruction of the corneas. Breathing in hydrogen fluoride at high levels or in combination with skin contact can cause death from an irregular heartbeat or from pulmonary edema (fluid buildup in the lungs).

References

External links

Fluorides, Hydrogen Fluoride, and Fluorine at ATSDR. Retrieved September 30, 2019
CDC - NIOSH Pocket Guide to Chemical Hazards
Hydrogen Fluoride Fact Sheet at Toxics Use Reduction Institute

Fluorides
Hazardous air pollutants
Hydrogen compounds
Industrial gases
Inorganic solvents
Nonmetal halides
Diatomic molecules